Daviyon Nixon (born December 13, 1998) is an American football defensive tackle who is a free agent. He played college football at Iowa Western and Iowa before he was selected by the Carolina Panthers in the fifth round of the 2021 NFL Draft.

Early life and high school
Nixon grew up in Kenosha, Wisconsin and attended Indian Trail High School and Academy, where he played basketball and football. He was named first-team All-Southeast Conference and first-team All-State as a senior. Nixon committed to play college football at Iowa over an offer from Purdue, but was not admitted after failing to qualify academically.

College career
Nixon began his collegiate career at Iowa Western Community College. He finished his freshman season with five sacks and nine tackles for loss and was named second-team All-Iowa Community College Athletic Conference. After one season, he qualified academically to play Division I football and committed to Iowa.

Nixon redshirted his first season at Iowa. As a redshirt sophomore, he played in all 13 of the Hawkeyes' games and finished the season with 29 tackles with 5.5 tackles for loss and three sacks. Nix was named first-team All-Big Ten Conference as well as the conference Defensive Player of the Year and Defensive Lineman of the Year and as a redshirt junior and was a unanimous first-team All-America selection.

Professional career

Carolina Panthers
Nixon was drafted by the Carolina Panthers in the fifth round, 158th overall, of the 2021 NFL Draft. He signed his four-year rookie contract on May 13, 2021. He was placed on injured reserve on October 28, 2021 with a knee injury.

Nixon was waived on September 5, 2022 and re-signed to the practice squad. He was promoted to the active roster on September 27. He was waived on December 13.

Seattle Seahawks
On December 21, 2022, Nixon signed with the Seattle Seahawks, but was waived six days later.

References

External links

Carolina Panthers bio
Iowa Western Reivers bio
Iowa Hawkeyes bio

1998 births
Living people
Players of American football from Wisconsin
Sportspeople from Kenosha, Wisconsin
American football defensive tackles
Iowa Hawkeyes football players
Iowa Western Reivers football players
All-American college football players
African-American players of American football
Carolina Panthers players
21st-century African-American sportspeople
Seattle Seahawks players